Staurolemma is a genus of lichenized fungi in the family Pannariaceae. The genus was circumscribed by German lichenologist Gustav Wilhelm Körber in 1867, with Staurolemma dalmaticum as the type species.

Species
Staurolemma carolinianum 
Staurolemma dalmaticum 
Staurolemma dussii 
Staurolemma fruticosum 
Staurolemma oculatum 
Staurolemma orbiculare 
Staurolemma perforatum 
Staurolemma weberi

References

Peltigerales
Lichen genera
Peltigerales genera
Taxa described in 1867
Taxa named by Gustav Wilhelm Körber